Emmanuel "Tawi" Acuña Billones (born April 14, 1946) is a Filipino politician. A member of the Liberal Party, he currently serves as a member of the Philippine House of Representatives representing the 1st District of Capiz since 2016.

Political career 
In 2016, Billones was elected member of the Philippine House of Representatives representing the 1st District of Capiz. He was re-elected in 2019 and in 2022.

Congressional career 
During the 17th Congress, Billones along with other congressional Liberals joined the minority bloc under the leadership of Rep. Miro Quimbo after the ouster of PDP-Laban House Speaker Pantaleon Alvarez.

References 

Living people
1946 births
Members of the House of Representatives of the Philippines from Capiz
Liberal Party (Philippines) politicians